Clemente "Xicoténcatl" Sánchez (9 July 1947 – 25 December 1978) was a Mexican professional boxer.

Professional career 
Sánchez turned professional in 1963 and won the Lineal and WBC featherweight title with a 3rd round knockout over Kuniaki Shibata in 1972. He lost the title in his first defense by a technical knockout to Jose Legra, but Sanchez had been stripped of his WBC belt after failing to make weight prior to the fight. He retired in 1975.

Death 
Sánchez was shot and killed in his home city of Monterrey in a traffic dispute in 1978, by a man who later identified himself to police as Carlos Rodriguez Treviño.

Professional boxing record

See also
Lineal championship
List of WBC world champions
List of Mexican boxing world champions

References

External links 
 

|-

|-

1947 births
1978 deaths
Deaths by firearm in Mexico
Featherweight boxers
Super-featherweight boxers
Lightweight boxers
Boxers from Nuevo León
Male murder victims
Mexican murder victims
World boxing champions
People murdered in Mexico
Sportspeople from Monterrey
Mexican male boxers